Bybee Peak is a summit in the U.S. state of Oregon.

Bybee Peak has the name of one William Bybee.

References

Mountains of Jackson County, Oregon
Mountains of Oregon